CCGS A. LeBlanc is the seventh of nine s operated by the Canadian Coast Guard. The ship entered service in 2014 and is based at Quebec City, Quebec. A. LeBlanc is tasked with enforcing Canadian maritime law within Canada's maritime borders.

Description
The patrol vessel is also equipped with two Northern Lights M1066 generators and one Northern Lights M1064 emergency generator. The ship has a complement of nine with five officers and four crew and has five additional berths. The ship is equipped with Sperry Marine Visionmaster FT navigational radar operating on the X and S-bands.

Service history

A. LeBlanc was ordered from Irving Shipbuilding in 2009 and the ship's keel was laid down on 27 October 2012 at Halifax Shipyards in Halifax, Nova Scotia with the yard number 6101. The ship was launched on 27 January 2014 and named for Agipit LeBlanc, a fishery control officer who was murdered in the line of duty. The ship was completed on 5 March 2014 and was accepted, following sea trials, on 20 March 2014.

A. LeBlanc is based at Quebec City, Quebec and is registered in Ottawa, Ontario.

References

Sources
 

2014 ships
Hero-class patrol vessels
Patrol vessels of the Canadian Coast Guard